Victoria Louise of Prussia (13 September 1892 – 11 December 1980) was the only daughter and the last child of Wilhelm II, German Emperor, and Augusta Victoria of Schleswig-Holstein. Through her father she was a great-granddaughter of both Emperor Wilhelm I and Queen Victoria. Her 1913 wedding to Prince Ernest Augustus of Hanover was the largest gathering of reigning monarchs in Germany since German unification in 1871, and one of the last great social events of European royalty before the First World War began fourteen months later.

Shortly after the wedding, Victoria Louise became the Duchess of Brunswick by marriage. Through her daughter Queen Frederica of Greece, Princess Victoria Louise was the maternal grandmother of Queen Sophia of Spain and Constantine II of Greece.

Early life and education

Princess Victoria Louise was born on 13 September 1892, the seventh child and only daughter of German Emperor Wilhelm II and Empress Augusta Victoria. "After six sons, God has given us our seventh child, a small but very strong little daughter," the empress wrote in her diary soon after the birth. The young princess was christened on 22 October, and was named after her paternal great-grandmother, Queen Victoria, and her paternal great great grandmother, Louise of Mecklenburg-Strelitz. Known officially as Victoria Louise, she was nicknamed "Sissy" by her family.

Historian Justin C. Vovk writes that Victoria Louise was intelligent like her paternal grandmother Empress Frederick, stately and dignified like her mother, but imperious and willful like her father. She enjoyed being the center of attention, and was her father's favourite. According to her eldest brother Crown Prince Wilhelm, Victoria Louise was "the only one of us who succeeded in her childhood in gaining a snug place" in their father's heart. In 1902, her English governess, Anne Topham, observed in their first meeting that the nine-year-old princess was friendly, energetic, and always quarreling with her next eldest brother, Prince Joachim. Anne later noted that the "warlike" emperor "unbends to a considerable extent when in the bosom of his family," and is the "dominating force of his daughter's life. His ideas, his opinions on men and things are persistently quoted by her."

The family resided at Homburg Castle, and Victoria Louise and Joachim would often visit their cousins – the children of the Prussian princesses Margaret and Sophia – at nearby Kronberg Castle. In 1905, the princess studied music with concert pianist Sandra Droucker. For a period of one week in May 1911, Victoria Louise traveled to England aboard the royal yacht Hohenzollern with her parents, where they visited their cousin George V, for the unveiling of a statue of Queen Victoria in front of Buckingham Palace. The princess's confirmation took place at Friedenskirche in Potsdam on 18 October 1909.

Marriage
In 1912, Ernest Augustus, the wealthy heir-apparent to the title of Duke of Cumberland and Teviotdale, came to the Berlin court to thank Emperor Wilhelm for having Crown Prince Wilhelm and Prince Eitel Friedrich attend the funeral of his brother, Prince George William. At the time, the House of Hanover lived in exile at Gmunden, Austria. While in Berlin, Ernest Augustus met Victoria Louise, and the two became smitten with each other. However, any discussions of marriage were prolonged for months due to political concerns; Ernest Augustus was also the heir to the Kingdom of Hanover, which had been annexed into the Kingdom of Prussia following the 1866 Austro-Prussian War. The Prussian crown prince was displeased with the match and wished that Ernest Augustus abdicate his rights to Hanover; in a compromise, it was decided that in exchange, he would succeed to the smaller duchy of Brunswick, of which his father was the lawful heir. The family had been barred from the succession to Brunswick due to their claims towards the Hanoverian kingdom. 

Ernest and Victoria were engaged in Karlsruhe on 11 February 1913. Their wedding, an extravagant affair, took place on 24 May 1913 in Berlin. It was hailed in the press as the end of the rift between the House of Hanover and House of Hohenzollern that had existed since the 1866 annexation. The Times described the union as akin to Romeo and Juliet, albeit with a happier ending. Despite press fixation on the union as a love match, it remains unclear if the match was one of love or politics; historian Eva Giloi believes that the marriage was more likely the result of Prussia's desire to end the rift, though in one of Victoria Louise's letters she described it as a "love match".

In a diplomatic gesture, Emperor Wilhelm invited almost all of his extended family. Also two imprisoned British spies Captain Stewart and Captain Trench, were pardoned and released by the Kaiser as a present to the United Kingdom. The wedding became the largest gathering of reigning monarchs in Germany since German unification in 1871, and one of the last great social events of European royalty before World War I began fourteen months later. Attendees included Wilhelm's cousins George V and Tsar Nicholas II. The wedding feast included 1,200 guests. Empress Augusta Victoria took the separation from her only daughter badly and wept.

Husband and children

The new duke and duchess of Brunswick moved into Brunswick Palace in the capital of Brunswick and began their family with the birth of their eldest son, Prince Ernest Augustus, less than a year after their wedding. They had four further children: Prince George William (b. 1915), Princess Frederica (b. 1917), Prince Christian Oscar (b. 1919), and Prince Welf Henry (b. 1923).

On 8 November 1918, her husband was forced to abdicate his throne along with the other German kings, grand dukes, dukes, and princes, and the duchy of Brunswick was subsequently abolished. The next year, he was deprived of his British peerages under the Titles Deprivation Act 1917 as a result of his service in the German army during the war.<ref>{{cite web|title=At the Court at Buckingham Palace, the 28th day of March, 1919.|url=http://www.london-gazette.co.uk/issues/31255/pages/4000|work=London Gazette|publisher=His Majesty's Stationery Office|access-date=28 November 2011|pages=Issue 31255, Page 4000|date=28 March 1919|quote= Their Lordships do humbly report to Your Majesty that the persons hereinafter named have adhered to Your Majesty's enemies during the present war: —His Royal Highness Leopold Charles, Duke of Albany, Earl of Clarence and Baron Arklow; His Royal Highness Ernest Augustus, Duke of Cumberland and Teviotdale, Earl of Armagh; His Royal Highness Ernest Augustus (Duke of Brunswick), Prince of Great Britain and Ireland; Henry, Viscount Taaffe of Corren and Baron of Ballymote."}}</ref>

Thus, when his father died in 1923, Ernest Augustus did not succeed to his father's British title of Duke of Cumberland. For the next thirty years, Ernest Augustus remained the head of the House of Hanover, living in retirement on his various estates with his family, mainly Blankenburg Castle in Germany and Cumberland Castle in Gmunden, Austria. He also owned Marienburg Castle near Hanover; however, the couple rarely lived there until 1945.

World War II
Several of Victoria Louise's brothers were early members of the Nazi party, including former Crown Prince Wilhelm and Prince August Wilhelm. While Ernest Augustus never officially joined the party, he donated funds and was close to several leaders. As a former British prince, Ernest Augustus as well as Victoria Louise desired a rapprochement between the United Kingdom and Germany. Ostensibly desiring to pursue an alliance with the UK, in the mid-1930s, Adolf Hitler took advantage of their sentiment by asking the couple to arrange a match between their daughter Princess Frederica and the Prince of Wales. The Duke and Duchess of Brunswick refused, believing that the age difference was too great; Princess Frederica would have been around 18 years of age while the prince was over 22 years older. After his abdication in 1936, Edward VIII and his wife visited "the Cumberlands" at Cumberland Castle in Gmunden, Austria. In 1938 Princess Frederica married the future King Paul of Greece.

In May 1941, her father fell ill from an intestinal blockage, and Victoria Louise traveled to Doorn to visit him, as did several of her brothers. Wilhelm recovered enough for them to depart, but soon relapsed. Victoria Louise returned in time to be at her father's bedside, along with nephew Louis Ferdinand and stepmother Hermine, when he died on 4 June 1941 of a pulmonary embolism. By the time of the war's ending in Europe in April 1945, Victoria Louise was living with her husband at Blankenburg Castle.

Later life

After the war, Victoria Louise spent much of her time attending public events in Lower Saxony, supporting palace restoration projects, high-society parties, hunting, and the showing of horses. She also spent time helping with philanthropic causes, for instance supporting a holiday estate for low-income children. Her husband died at Marienburg on 30 January 1953. When her eldest son made Marienburg a museum in 1954 and moved himself to Calenberg Estate nearby, she became at odds with him, although he had offered her several other manor houses to move in. There was also a rivalry between them about her popularity and public appearances. Instead, she moved back to Brunswick, occupying a house which had been offered to her by a wealthy industrialist and a circle of fans called "Braunschweiger Freundeskreis" (circle of Brunswick friends). She lived there until her death.

In 1965 she published her autobiography Life as Daughter of the Emperor, and thereafter several other books, including biographies of her mother and of her sister-in-law Cecilie, the last crown princess of Germany. It is however believed that her publisher Leonhard Schlüter served as her ghostwriter. 

She is buried next to her husband in front of the Royal Mausoleum in the Berggarten at Herrenhausen Gardens in Hanover, which is the burial chapel of Ernest Augustus, King of Hanover, and his wife and, since his reburial after World War II, also of George I of Great Britain.

Publications

Approximate translations of the titles into English are given in parentheses.Ein Leben als Tochter des Kaisers ("Life as Daughter of the Emperor")Im Strom der Zeit ("In the Stream of Time")Bilder der Kaiserzeit ("Pictures from the Imperial Period")Vor 100 Jahren ("100 Years Ago")Die Kronprinzessin ("The Crown Princess")Deutschlands letzte Kaiserin ("Germany's Last Empress")

Legacy
David Jones records in his prose-poem In Parenthesis a fragment of song from the Western Front"I want Big Willie's luv-ly daughter"implying (as Jones notes) "that the object of the British Expedition into France was to enjoy the charms of the Emperor's daughter".

A number of vessels were named for the princess:
 , protected cruiser launched 29 March 1897, scrapped in 1923.
 Prinzessin Victoria Luise, launched 29 June 1900; wrecked off Jamaica, 16 December 1906.
 Viktoria Luise, launched 10 January 1900, as the Deutschland; refitted and renamed Viktoria Luise, 1910; renamed Hansa 1921; sold for scrap, 1925.
 The Zeppelin LZ 11 of the Verkehrsluftschiff der Deutschen Luftschifffahrts Aktiengesellschaft (DELAG) was named Viktoria Luise.

Honours
  Dame of the Order of the Black Eagle (Kingdom of Prussia)
  Dame, 1st Class, of the Order of Louise (Kingdom of Prussia)
  Dame of the Royal Order of Saint George (Hanoverian Royal Family)
  Dame Grand Cross of the Royal Family Order of Saints Olga and Sophia (Kingdom of Greece)
  Dame of the Order of Queen Maria Luisa, 24 May 1913 (Spain)
  Order of the Medjidie, Special Class for Ladies (Ottoman Empire)
  Dame Grand Cordon of the Order of Charity (Ottoman Empire)
  Dame Grand Cross of the Imperial Austrian Order of Elizabeth, 1911 (Austria-Hungary)

Regimental commissions
  Regimentschefin (Regimental Chief) and Oberst à la suite'' (Honorary Colonel), 2. Leib-Husaren Regiment Königin Victoria von Preußen Nr. 2, ca. 1909

Issue

Ancestry

References

Works cited

 
 - Total pages: 544

External links
 
 Historical footage of the marriage of Victoria Louise in May 1913, filmportal.de

|-

1892 births
1980 deaths
19th-century German people
20th-century German people
19th-century German women
20th-century German women
House of Hohenzollern
Prussian princesses
Duchesses of Brunswick
Wives of British princes
Hanoverian princesses by marriage
People from Potsdam
Recipients of the Order of the Medjidie
Daughters of emperors
Burials at Berggarten Mausoleum, Herrenhausen (Hanover)
Children of Wilhelm II, German Emperor
Daughters of kings